The 2022–23 season is the 123rd season in the history of AFC Ajax and their 67th consecutive season in the top flight. The club are participating in the Eredivisie, KNVB Cup, Johan Cruyff Shield, UEFA Champions League, and UEFA Europa League.

The mid-season break was longer and started earlier because of the 2022 FIFA World Cup in Qatar, with the last match on 13 November 2022, and the first match after the World Cup on 8 January 2023 (following the World Cup final on 18 December 2022).

Players

Squad

Transfers

In

Out

Loans in

Loans out

Overview

Pre-season
New manager Alfred Schreuder, arriving from Club Brugge, began the new season on 22 June 2022. On 1 June, several Dutch media wrote that assistant coach Winston Bogarde would no longer be part of the technical staff of the club in the upcoming season. On 7 June, Ajax announced that main shirt sponsor Ziggo would extend their sponsorship on the back of the shirt with the name of their fibre optic cable name ‘GigaNet’. On 17 June, Dutch media confirmed that Matthias Kaltenbach would replace Bogarde as assistant coach and come to Ajax for a minimal transfer fee. On 19 June, Ajax released their new home kit for the new season.

Pre-season and friendlies

Pre-season 
Ajax had a training camp in De Lutte, Netherlands from 27 June to 3 July. There they hosted two friendly matches against German sides SV Meppen and SC Paderborn. On 1 July the club announced two further friendlies against Lokomotiva Zagreb from Croatia and KAS Eupen from Belgium, which were played behind closed doors. There was then a training camp in Austria from 17 to 23 July where Ajax played against Red Bull Salzburg on 19 July in Saalfelden and Eintracht Frankfurt on 23 July. Although the last match was cancelled due to several COVID-19 cases in the Ajax-squad. On 26 July there was a charity game against the Ukrainian side Shakhtar Donetsk, the proceeds from which were provided to various charities and organisations supporting Ukrainian refugees.

On-season

Mid-season 
Ajax had a mid-season training camp in Marbella, Spain. From 28 November until 3 December, without the players that were on the 2022 FIFA World Cup in Qatar. The last day there was a training match against Blackburn Rovers.

Competitions

Overall record

Eredivisie

League table

Results summary

Results by round

Matches
The league fixtures were announced on 14 June 2022.

KNVB Cup

Johan Cruyff Shield

UEFA Champions League

Group stage

The draw for the group stage was held on 25 August 2022.

UEFA Europa League

Knockout phase

Knockout round play-offs
The knockout round play-offs draw was held on 7 November 2022.

Statistics

Appearances and goals

|-
|colspan="14"|Players sold or loaned out after the start of the season:

|-

Goalscorers

Clean sheets

Disciplinary record

References

AFC Ajax seasons
Ajax
Ajax